Live Ballads is the first live CD or video album, and eleventh album overall by popular Greek singer Sakis Rouvas, released in Greece and Cyprus on 27 April 2006 by Minos EMI.  The concert was recorded on 14 February 2006 as a special Valentine's Day performance called Sakis For Valentines. Sakis sang only love oriented ballads in both Greek and English from his large repertoire and covers of other artists. The concert was much more intimate than his common large-scale performances and was held at the Athens College auditorium where Rouvas performed especially for the students as a "thank you" to his young fans, often being called "The Singer of Youth".

Track listing

CD

DVD

Live Ballads: Special Edition
The special edition comes repackaged in a 10"×12.5" gift box, featuring a bonus DVD of the performance and a high-quality photo book showcasing images from the concert.

Release history

Music videos

"Horis Kardia"
"Without You" / "Dodeka"
"Agapa Me" / "Na M'agapas" (MAD VMAs 2006)
"O,ti Onirevomoun"
"Ain't No Sunshine"

References

External links
Sakis Rouvas' official website
IFPI Greece official website with Greek charts

Albums produced by Sakis Rouvas
Greek-language albums
Music videos directed by Kostas Kapetanidis
Sakis Rouvas live albums
Sakis Rouvas video albums
Live video albums
2006 video albums
2006 live albums
Minos EMI live albums
Minos EMI video albums